USS Tech III (SP-1055) was a United States Navy patrol vessel in commission from August to October 1917.

Tech III was built as a private motorboat of the same name in 1916 by Adolph Apel at Atlantic City, New Jersey. On 6 August 1917, the U.S. Navy leased her from her owner, the engineer and politician T. Coleman du Pont (1863–1930) of Wilmington, Delaware, for use as a section patrol boat during World War I. She was commissioned on 7 August 1917 as USS Tech III (SP-1055).

Assigned to the 4th Naval District, Tech III served on patrol duties there. Although Navy inspectors had described her as a "Very fast and desirable boat for general use" prior to her acquisition, she apparently proved unsatisfactory, and her service ended after less than  months.

Tech III was decommissioned on 19 October 1917 and ordered returned to du Pont "when repaired". Her name did not disappear from the 4th Naval District list of district vessels until the 1 September 1918 issue of the Navy Directory, so she seems to have remained in the possession of the Navy until the summer of 1918. Presumably, she was returned to her owner sometime in mid-1918 and her name was stricken from the Navy List at that time.

Notes

References

Department of the Navy Naval History and Heritage Command Online Library of Selected Images: Civilian Ships: Tech III (American Motor Boat, 1916). Served as USS Tech III (SP-1055) in 1917
NavSource Online: Section Patrol Craft Photo Archive Tech III (SP 1055)

Patrol vessels of the United States Navy
World War I patrol vessels of the United States
Ships built in Atlantic City, New Jersey
1916 ships